California Dreaming is a novel by Zoey Dean, part of The A-List series about teens in Beverly Hills.

Plot summary

The book picks up with Anna Percy leaving for Bali with her childhood friend, Logan. Unfortunately, there is a problem with the plane so it turns around and heads back to L.A. When Sam hears news of the troubled flight, she turns to fiancée Eduardo and proposes that if Anna is safe, then they will get married within the week. Anna indeed does make it out safely from the plane and at the airport, her father and Sam are waiting for her. Ben was also there, watching from afar but decides to leave when he sees Anna and Logan kiss, not wanting to ruin the happy moment.

Before going to the airport, Ben was with Cammie at the new club, Bye Bye Love, when Adam Flood unexpectedly showed up, hoping to get back together with Cammie. Sam meets her parents Jackson and Dina, who flew in for the occasion, to meet Eduardo's parents, Consuela and Pedro, to discuss the engagement. The adults are hesitant about the marriage since Sam will be at USC film school and Eduardo will be in Paris for work. Sam doesn't know if she wants to give up her place at her dream school just to be with Eduardo in a different country and tells the others she is not ready to make her decision. Similarly, Anna is indecisive over whether to go to Yale as planned or go with Logan to Bali. Instead, she decides to finish the screenplay on her laptop that she started in Manhattan and sends it to Sam.

Sam asks Cammie to be her Maid Of Honor and for Dee to be a bridesmaid, excited for the wedding but when she attends a USC orientation, she is surprised to find herself excited for school. Later, Sam is annoyed that Cammie is concentrating on her club rather than the wedding so she appoints Dee as her new maid of honor.

Anna is with Logan when she gets an emergency call-her dad at the hospital with a case of subdural hematoma. Sam also comes to the hospital to show support for Anna. Ben also shows up, tipped off by Sam, and apologizes to Anna shows up saying that he's sorry how things turned out between them. Susan, Anna's estranged sister, arrives and offers to take care of their father so Anna can be free to go to Yale.

Sam reads Anna's screenplay, but does not tell her. Instead, she goes to Marty Martison,a huge movie producer, to see if it can be made but she leaves disappointed. Later on, Sam goes for a fitting on her new dress designed by Giselle and suspects she is a lesbian. After Dina arrives, the two have a heart-to-heart conversation about why Dina was never present in her life.

Anna makes her final decision and tells Logan she hasn't regretted anything they've done together, but she's not going to Bali with him and she is not attending Yale either. Sam begins having pre-wedding jitters and starts to wonder if she is too young to get married when she walks in to her father and mother kissing. Sam goes back to the rehearsal to say she can't get married, but her parents try to convince her it is only pre-wedding jitters. Cammie disagrees and announces that Sam doesn't want to get married at all. Eduardo is hurt and tells Sam he wishes he never met her.

Sam and Anna are out for drinks next day and they decide to make big plans for Anna's last day. Sam calls Cammie, who is with Ben. The two agree to be just be friends when she receives Sam's call who tells her to grab her bridesmaid's dress and meet her and Anna on Jackson Sharpe's boat.

While on the boat, Anna is confronted by none other than Marty Maritson, saying that he read her screenplay and offers to make a deal. Anna is shocked but quickly agrees, one the condition that Sam directs. Anna talks to Sam and they agree to change the title to The A-List and start discussing actors to star in it, setting the stage for The A-List: Hollywood Royalty. Cammie goes to Adam and apologizes to him, saying she will move to Michigan to be with him, just to be together but Adam reveals he will be attending Pomona, a college nearby. The two kiss and get back together.

While Sam's mom and dad are getting remarried, a helicopter enters with Eduardo who apologizes to Sam and asks her to keep in touch. Anna and Ben meet up and Anna tells him she loves him. The books ends with the two sharing their first kiss since their break up. This book is the last novel in the series.

2008 American novels
Novels set in Los Angeles